Geraldo Nascimento (18 May 1936 – 6 November 2022) was a Brazilian Catholic prelate.

He was ordained to the priesthood in 1967. From 1982 to 1997 he served as auxiliary bishop of Fortaleza and until his death was titular bishop of Zama Major. He was a member of the O.F.M. Cap.

References

1936 births
2022 deaths
Brazilian Roman Catholic bishops
Bishops appointed by Pope John Paul II
Capuchin bishops
People from Ceará